Superstar is the first studio album by Nepalese rapper VTEN, released on January 20, 2020, by Trap Nepal. It is also the most viewed & streamed Nepalese hip hop album on platform like YouTube & Spotify. Album's sixth track Yatra has over 40 million views in YouTube, which is most for any Nepalese hip hop song.

Superstar is a concept album that analyzes and reflects on VTEN's journey of coming from village to being superstar of Nepalese hip hop and also reflects about local police arresting him for “allegedly promoting ‘anti-social’ values".

Track listing 
Credits adapted from YouTube description.

References 

2020 debut albums
Hip hop albums by Nepalese artists
Concept albums